Azizabad  is a neighborhood in the Karachi Central District of Karachi, Pakistan.

See also
Karachi Central District

References

External links 
 Karachi Website.

Neighbourhoods of Karachi
Gulberg Town, Karachi
Karachi Central District